Afuang: Bounty Hunter is a 1988 Philippine biographical action film directed by Mike Relon Makiling. The film stars Phillip Salvador as the title role. The film is based on the life of Abner Afuang, a former police officer who was a Pagsanjan mayor by the time the film was released.

Critic Lav Diaz gave Afuang a positive review for its writing, production design and action scenes, though he opposed the film's superhuman-like portrayal of Afuang.

The film is streaming online on YouTube.

Cast

Phillip Salvador as Pfc. Abner Afuang
Eddie Garcia as Lauro Glorietta
Mark Gil as Benjie
Marianne de la Riva as Evelyn Afuang
Charlie Davao as Col. Garriga
Zandro Zamora as Capt. Garcia
Ruel Vernal as Boy Paredes' brother
Mon Godiz as Joey
Lala Montelibano as Dolly
Lucita Soriano as Baldoza's wife
Gladys Reyes as Avlyn Afuang
Via Nueva as Dez
Ros Olgado as Ilustre
Ernie Forte as Baldoza
Nanding Fernandez as Maj. Diaz
Chito Alcid as Ruben
Rene Hawkins as Boy Bombay
Bill Afuang Jr. as policeman
Mel Arca as Dodong Bautista
Jimmy Reyes as Boy Paredes
Joey Padilla as Asyong
Joe Jardy as boy of Glorietta
Alex Toledo as Efren
Romy Romulo as Cardo
Dindo Arroyo as Boyet
Roger Moring as Charlie
Rene Quintos as Sarge
Arman Bragado as policeman
Gary Abaca
Ronald Edio as Afuang twin
Glen Edio as Afuang twin
Baby Saño as Emang
Ernie Zarate as Mr. Laurete
Nemie Gutierrez as de los Santos
Buddy de Leon as boy of Glorietta
Big Boy Gomez as boy of Glorietta
Roger Santos as boy of Glorietta

Release
Afuang was released in theaters on February 25, 1988.

Critical response
Lav Diaz, writing his first film review for the Manila Standard, gave Afuang a positive review, commending the film's writing, production design, pacing, and action scenes, while also praising the film's "direct attack" on corruption within the police force. However, he expressed that his main gripe is the film's exaggerated portrayal of Afuang as a superhuman-like character, stating that "if the film's basis on real life is removed, [Afuang] becomes a nice action movie." Diaz was also critical of actor Eddie Garcia for his continued portrayal of "kenkoy" villains in films.

Accolades

References

External links

Full Movie on Viva Films

1988 films
1980s biographical films
1988 action films
Action films based on actual events
Filipino-language films
Films about police corruption
Philippine action films
Philippine biographical films
Viva Films films
Films directed by Mike Relon Makiling